Tamaz Imnaishvili (born July 28, 1954 in Tbilisi) is a Georgian sport shooter. He competed in skeet shooting events at the Summer Olympics in 1980 and 1988 for the Soviet Union and in 1996 for Georgia.

Olympic results

References

1954 births
Living people
Skeet shooters
Male sport shooters from Georgia (country)
Shooters at the 1980 Summer Olympics
Shooters at the 1988 Summer Olympics
Shooters at the 1996 Summer Olympics
Olympic shooters of the Soviet Union
Olympic shooters of Georgia (country)